Jotin Bhattacharya was an Indian classical sarod player. Jyotin was a disciple of Allauddin Khan.

Early life and education
Bhattacharya was born in 1926 in Varanasi in a Bengali family. He attended C.M. Anglo Bengali College and subsequently attained bachelor's, master's and MPhil degrees from the Benaras Hindu University before starting his eight-year music training from Allauddin Khan. During his training under Allauddin Khan, Bhattacharya also served him as a secretary and handled all his correspondences.

Bhattacharya performed at the Baba Allauddin Khan Music Foundation in the Poorva Sanskritik Kendra, Laxmi Nagar, Delhi.

Album

In 1974, HMV released Bhattacharya's first album, Sarod, in LP record format.

Books
Bhattacharya wrote three books (all about Allauddin Khan).

See also

Sarod
Baba Allauddin Khan

References 

1926 births
2016 deaths
Hindustani instrumentalists
Bengali musicians
Musicians from Varanasi
Indian music educators
Sarod players